Neylor Lopes Gonçalves or simply Neylor (born April 2, 1987 in Colorado-PR), is a Brazilian central defender who currently plays for Boa Esporte Clube.

Contract
27 February 2007 to 26 February 2010

External links
federacaopr
CBF

1987 births
Living people
Brazilian footballers
Santos FC players
Club Athletico Paranaense players
Villa Nova Atlético Clube players
Association football defenders